The Biggest Loser Brunei (season 3): Lose It All is the third season of The Biggest Loser Brunei, which is the Bruneian version of the NBC reality television series The Biggest Loser. This season called Lose It All because this is the biggest show of this Brunei's series and to prove to people for keep losing weight weather on the ranch or outside the ranch. This season premiered March 13, 2012. This season introduce the new trainer, Cristine Phoebe for replacing Juliana Mikael which not return for her third season.

The finale aired on July 10, 2012 and Nurul Hannah who lost 111 pounds won the title of The Biggest Loser make her the first ever female contestant win this show after two male on past season. Fernandez Aljunied won the prize for at-home contestants. In the end of the show Stacy Sandra told that next season will be airing next year and she will not return to the show and will be replaced by Sarah Rahman. Ezuan Aziz also announced that he will not return for next season.

Contestants
This season featured 27 contestants with nine different team colors. They will train by three trainers, each trainer will train three teams respectively. However, on week 1, Stacy told that one of each team will sent home and will be back on future. On week 6, Dicky and Rashid returned on ranch because they have the highest percentage of weight loss and the rest do not have a spot to back on ranch. In the same week, Stacy told that the gameplay changed which is Blue vs Red vs Black. However, in the end of week 9, Stacy told that the eliminated players who do not have a spot on ranch will returns. Fernandez who wins the marathon among them returned on ranch week 10. Starting week 10, the games on with 4 teams which is Blue vs Red vs Black vs White. The Commando returns to train White teams. Zahir and Amar fall below the yellow line on week 17 and viewers had to determine who will be the finalist join Hannah and Tiara and Brunei vote off Zahir.

Weigh-In

Standings
 Week's Biggest Loser
 Week's Biggest Loser and Immunity
 Immunity (Challenge or Weigh-In)
 Last person eliminated before the finale
 Results from At-Home playersY
 Did not weigh-in
BMI
 Underweight (less than 18.5 BMI)
 Normal (18.5–24.9 BMI)b
 Overweight (25–29.9 BMI)
 Obese Class I (30–34.9 BMI)
 Obese Class II (35–39.9 BMI)
 Obese Class III (greater than 40 BMI)
Winners
 B$250,000 (among the finalists)
 B$100,000 Winner (among the eliminated contestants)

Weigh-In Figures History

Elimination Voting History

 Not in house
 Immunity
 Immunity, vote not revealed
 Immunity, was below yellow line or not in elimination, unable to vote
 Below yellow line, unable to vote
 Below yellow line, escaped from elimination, unable to vote
 Below yellow line, saved by week's Biggest Loser, unable to vote
 Below red line, automatically eliminated
 Not in elimination, unable to vote
 Eliminated or not in house
 Last person eliminated (at the finale) via public voting
 Valid vote cast
 Vote not revealed
 B$250,000 winner (among the finalists)
 Lost arrive at ranch weigh-in, was automatically eliminated
 Below yellow line, Brunei's vote.

External links
 Brunei's Biggest Loser official Twitter account.

Mass media in Brunei
Brunei 3
2012 Bruneian television seasons